Fall to Pieces is the fourteenth studio album by English trip hop artist Tricky. It was released on 4 September 2020 via False Idols. It features guest appearances from Marta and Oh Land.

Critical reception 

Fall to Pieces was met with generally favorable reviews from critics. At Metacritic, which assigns a normalized rating out of 100 to reviews from mainstream publications, the album received an average score of 73 based on twelve reviews. The aggregator AnyDecentMusic? has the critical consensus of the album at a 7.7 out of 10, based on thirteen reviews. The aggregator Album of the Year assessed the critical consensus as 73 out of 100, based on fifteen reviews.

Track listing

Charts

References 

2020 albums
Tricky (musician) albums